The 1997 National Invitation Tournament was the 1997 edition of the annual NCAA college basketball competition.  Michigan's tournament victory was later vacated due to players Robert Traylor and Louis Bullock being ruled ineligible by the NCAA.  Traylor also vacated his tournament Most Valuable Player award.

Selected teams
Below is a list of the 32 teams selected for the tournament.

Bracket
Below are the four first round brackets, along with the four-team championship bracket.

Semifinals & finals

Michigan later forfeited its entire 1996–97 schedule after Robert Traylor, Maurice Taylor and Louis Bullock were found to have taken money from a Michigan booster.

See also
 1997 NCAA Division I men's basketball tournament
 1997 NCAA Division II men's basketball tournament
 1997 NCAA Division III men's basketball tournament
 1997 NCAA Division I women's basketball tournament
 1997 NCAA Division II women's basketball tournament
 1997 NCAA Division III women's basketball tournament
 1997 NAIA Division I men's basketball tournament
 1997 NAIA Division II men's basketball tournament
 1997 NAIA Division I women's basketball tournament
 1997 NAIA Division I women's basketball tournament

References

National Invitation
National Invitation Tournament
1990s in Manhattan
Basketball competitions in New York City
College sports in New York City
Madison Square Garden
National Invitation Tournament
National Invitation Tournament
Sports in Manhattan